Jagar is a Gram Panchayat in Hindaun Block,  Karauli District, Rajasthan. Approximately 9000 people live there.

Demographics
Inhabitants of Jagar speak Hindi.

References

Hindaun Block